Echo Dnia (Echo of the Day) - Kielce regional daily newspaper established in 1971. It was among best-selling regional newspapers in Poland (according to the Connection of the Inspection of Distribution of the Press).

Privatized in 1991, a Kielce Agency of Trade and Marketing became his owner Acumen.  On 8 July 1991 it had a new design and the format.  In 1992 title seized by the new owner which a Mitex building enterprise, belonging to the known Kielce businessman of Michał Sołowow.

The newspaper is printed in three editions: Kielce, Radom and Subcarpathian.  Apart from the editing two editorial branches in Radom and Tarnobrzeg operate in Kielce. The newspaper is distributed in three provinces: Świętokrzyskie Voivodeship, Subcarpathian Voivodeship (four districts: Mielec, Nisko, Stalowa Wola and Tarnobrzeg) and South Masovian, Radom, Przysucha. 
Fixed allowances are being attached to the basic newspaper: on Monday - Super Sports Echo, on Tuesday - My House, on Wednesday - Our Style, on Thursday - Health, on Friday - Super Relaxation and on the area of some districts weeklies: Ponidzie Echo, Echo of Powiśle, Echo of Końskie, Echo Skarżysko-Kamienna, Starachowice Echo, Echo of Ostrowiec Świętokrzyski, Jędrzejów Echo and Włoszczowa Echo; on Saturday - Laid-back.

On 1 June 2006 the Echo of the Day united with the Word keeping the old title. At present the newspaper belongs to the British Mecom Group. Stanisław Wróbel is the editor-in-chief.

Its print and e-edition circulation was 21,952 in August 2014.

References

Mass media in Kielce
Daily newspapers published in Poland
Newspapers established in 1971
1971 establishments in Poland